Sop Poeng is a tambon (subdistrict) of Mae Taeng District, in Chiang Mai Province, Thailand. In 2020 it had a total population of 7,744 people.

Administration

Central administration
The tambon is subdivided into 13 administrative villages (muban).

Local administration
The whole area of the subdistrict is covered by the subdistrict administrative organization (SAO) Sop Poeng (องค์การบริหารส่วนตำบลสบเปิง).

References

External links
Thaitambon.com on Sop Poeng

Tambon of Chiang Mai province
Populated places in Chiang Mai province